The 2005 Skate America was the first event of six in the 2005–06 ISU Grand Prix of Figure Skating, a senior-level international invitational competition series. It was held at the Boardwalk Hall in Atlantic City, New Jersey on October 20–23. Medals were awarded in the disciplines of men's singles, ladies' singles, pair skating, and ice dancing. Skaters earned points toward qualifying for the 2005–06 Grand Prix Final. The compulsory dance was the Ravensburger Waltz.

Results

Men

Ladies

Pairs

Ice dancing

External links
 
 ESPN SP Report

Skate America, 2005
Skate America